État 141-001 to 141-250, was a series of 2-8-2 steam locomotives of the Chemins de Fer de l'État.

Overview
The series of 250 engines, numbered 141-001 to 141-250 were built in 1921. They were renumbered 141.B.001 to 141.B.250 by the SNCF in 1938 and ended their career in the West of France at the end of the 1960s.

Design
The engines were capable of a speed of up 100 km/h. Their light weight per axle made them capable of hauling both passenger and goods trains on most of the Chemins de Fer de l'État'''s network and of the former Chemins de Fer de l'Ouest. Due to the need of a simple to operate and solid locomotive, the Chemins de Fer de l'État even went to choose the pressure of the boiler (or timbre in French).

141.C.50 was rebuilt at Sotteville-lès-Rouen in 1928. This depot was built by the British and was the largest of the Chemins de Fer de l'Ouest (part of the État from 1908). There it received new Renaud type valves, saving 9.8% coal. It also received a Kylchap exhaust.

Preservation
One locomotive has been preserved: 141.C.100 (and tender 22.B.609) are in working order and are listed as a Monument historique''.

References

141-001
2-8-2 locomotives
Schneider locomotives
Railway locomotives introduced in 1921
Standard gauge locomotives of France